The International Social Survey Programme (ISSP) is a collaboration between different nations conducting surveys covering topics which are useful for social science research. The ISSP researchers develop questions which are meaningful and relevant to all countries which can be expressed in an equal manner in different languages. The results of the surveys provide a cross-national and cross-cultural perspective to individual national studies.  By 2021, 58 countries have already taken part in the ISSP.

History 
The ISSP was founded in 1984 by research organizations from four countries:
 Zentrum für Umfragen, Methoden, und Analysen (ZUMA), Mannheim, Germany, now GESIS – Leibniz Institute for the Social Sciences
 National Opinion Research Center (NORC), University of Chicago, Chicago, Illinois, United States.
 Social and Community Planning Research (SCPR), London, United Kingdom, now National Centre for Social Research, NatCen
 Research School of Social Sciences (RSSS), Australian National University, now School of Demography Canberra, Australia.

Four different Social Surveys included a common module each year:
 The British Social Attitudes Survey (BSA) in the UK
 The General Social Survey (GSS) in the USA
 The ALLBUS or German General Social Survey (GGSS) in Germany and 
 The Surveys by the Research School of Social Sciences
Since then social science institutions from 58 different countries included a 15-minute supplement to their national surveys. The membership to the ISSP is institutional and by country. One or more than one institute in a country can co-operate on ISSP research (cf. France and Spain). The common module surveyed by the member institutions also contains an extensive common core of background variables. The modules focus on one specific topic each year and were planned to be repeated more or less every five to ten years. When it comes to the researchers choice of topics, the relevance of the area of social sciences in the year of the survey is taken into account.
Given this, the ISSP deliveries data sets are helpful for both Cross-sectional studies and Time series analysis.
Over time the set of modules has grown towards more diverse topics. The latest additions were Leisure Time and Sports in 2007 as well as Health and Health Care in 2011.

Organisation 
The ISSP is a self-funding organisation with an emphasis on democratic decision making stated in its working principles. To accomplish this principle it has set up several groups and committees. These groups either consist of member organisations as a whole or include some particular social scientists. There are:
 The ISSP secretariat (2021-2024): FORS - Swiss Centre for Expertise in the Social Sciences, Switzerland
 The ISSP archive (GESIS Data Archive for the Social Sciences, Germany)
 Methodology research groups
 The ISSP sub-groups drawn up within the ISSP
 Drafting groups for modules
 The ISSP Standing Committee
Most of the members of these groups are elected democratically at the General Assembly. These meetings of delegates from every member state of the ISSP are held in May or June in changing locations all around the world. The General Assemblies also serve the function of discussing modules, which are to be completed the same year or begun and surveyed the upcoming one. The delegates also discuss the topics of upcoming modules.

The ISSP also gives importance to the way member organisations implement their surveys. The organisation's principles are published in its ethical statement and its working principles.

Methodology 
The methodological work in the ISSP is coordinated by a Methodology Committee, consisting of six members elected at the General Meeting. It co-ordinates the work of six groups addressing different areas of cross-cultural methods, all concerned with issues of equivalence: demography, non-response, weighting, mode effects, questionnaire design and translation.

Modules by year 
The datasets from the different modules conducted by participating ISSP member states can be downloaded at the GESIS Archive page. All these links lead to the official GESIS – Leibniz Institute for the Social Sciences homepage, where the data is provided openly for research purposes.

Modules by topic

Members (1984–2021)

References

External links
 Official website
 French ISSP Website
 GESIS ISSP Archive
 International Journal of Sociology special issues on ISSP data

Bibliography 
 Davis, James A., and Roger Jowell. "Measuring national differences: an introduction to the International Social Survey Programme (ISSP)." British Social Attitudes: Special International Report, edited by Roger Jowell, Sharon Witherspoon, and Lindsay Brook. Aldershot: Gower (1989): 1-13.
 Smith, Tom W. "The international social survey program." International Journal of Public Opinion Research 4.3 (1992): 1992.
 Max Haller, Roger Jowell et Tom Smith (dir.), Charting the Globe: The International Social Survey Programme, 1984-2009, London, Routledge, 2009

1984 establishments
Social research
Social science institutes
Social science methodology
Social statistics
Social statistics data
Surveys (human research)